A scurfpea is a legume that may belong to any of several genera of plants, including:

Cullen
Hoita
Pediomelum
Psoralea
Psoralidium
Rupertia